Decisions is an album by the George Adams-Don Pullen Quartet recorded in 1984 for the Dutch Timeless label.

Reception
The Allmusic review by Steve Loewy awarded the album 4½ stars stating "There are some tasty extended solos by all the players, and the choice of tunes is impressive, even if sometimes they sound like simple heads... When the Quartet was at its best, as it sometimes is here, it was simply unbeatable".

Track listing
All compositions by Don Pullen except as indicated
 "Trees and Grass and Things" - 9:07 
 "His Eye Is on the Sparrow" (Traditional) - 4:28 
 "Message Urgent" (George Adams) - 8:16 
 "Decisions" - 7:11 
 "Triple Over Time" (Dannie Richmond) - 8:19 
 "I Could Really for You" (Adams) - 7:00 
Recorded in Monster, the Netherlands on February 2 & 3, 1984

Personnel
Don Pullen – piano
George Adams – tenor saxophone, vocals
Cameron Brown – bass
Dannie Richmond – drums

References

Timeless Records albums
Don Pullen albums
George Adams (musician) albums
1984 albums
Collaborative albums